Philip Philipse (1663–1699) was the eldest son and heir of Frederick Philipse, a Dutch-born merchant trader, slaver, land baron, and 1st Lord of Philipsburg Manor.  However, he died before his father, and by Frederick's will Philip's legacy was split between his bachelor brother Adolphus Philipse and his son Frederick Philipse II, who became the 2nd Lord of Philipse Manor.

Upon the death of his uncle in 1750, Frederick II inherited Adolphus' share as well, consolidating Philipse wealth in Philip's line.

Early life
Philip Philipse was the eldest son of Frederick Philipse (1626–1702), Lord of Philipsburg Manor and Margaret Hardenbroeck (c.1637–c.1690).

Lost inheritance
As eldest, he stood to inherit the Manor – holdings which reached 80 square miles of southernmost Westchester County – family commercial interests in shipping and slaving, and the hereditary title. He died in 1699 (some accounts 1700), predeceasing his father, who died in 1702.  

By the terms of his father's will, dated 26th October, 1700, proved 1702, Philip's younger brother Adolphus received all the Manor north of Dobb's Ferry, including the present town.  He was also named proprietor of a tract of land on the west bank of the Hudson north of Anthony's Nose and executor of Philip's estate. The balance passed on to Philip's son, Frederick Philipse II, establishing him as second Lord of Philipsborough Manor. 

Upon the death of his bachelor uncle Adolphus in 1750, Frederick II inherited Adolphus' share of Philipse lands and commercial interests received from Frederick I, as well as the Highland Patent Adolphus had been granted by the Crown for lands purchased north of Westchester County between the Hudson River and the Connecticut Colony.  Later known as the Philipse Patent, the roughly 250 square mile parcel became today's Putnam County.

Personal life

Philipse married Maria, daughter of John Sparke(s) of Devon, England, and Barbados, said but not proven to be the Governor of Barbados, in 1697.  The couple had two children:
 Maritje Maria Philipse (1687-1732), who married Jacobus Cromwell
 Frederick Philipse (1698-1751), who married Johanna Brockholst in 1726.

References

Sources 
 Eberlein, Harold D., and Cortlandt V. Hubbard. Historic Houses of the Hudson Valley. New York, 1942.
 Pelletreau, William S. History of Putnam County, New York. Philadelphia, 1886.

1663 births
1699 deaths
American members of the Dutch Reformed Church
American people of Dutch descent
People of the Province of New York
Philip 1663